Das Opfer (English: The Sacrifice) is a one-act opera by Winfried Zillig.

Libretto

Both the play and the opera are based on the Terra Nova Expedition led by Robert Falcon Scott. 

Zillig, an admirer of Die Südpolexpedition, asked Goering to adapt his play into an opera libretto in 1930. The playwright delivered the libretto to Zillig in April 1936, before committing suicide in October of the same year.
The libretto of Das Opfer has drawn notoriety because the chorus members dress as penguins for much of the opera, even though penguins do not inhabit the polar plateau where the action is set. According to Zillig, the penguins represent "hostile nature" (feindselige Natur) over which Oates triumphs by his act of sacrifice.

Roles

Synopsis
Time: 1912 
Place: South Pole

Part One

In an Antarctic night, four explorers slowly come into view. The overture begins.  Members of the chorus transform themselves into penguins by donning masks and costumes.

Scott, Wilson, and Bowers appear from the background, with Oates further behind. They are the only surviving members of the expedition.

Scott states that Oates' frozen feet are hampering the progress of the other three men, but all agree that they must not abandon him. As Oates slowly approaches, the chorus of penguins mocks him. Oates decides to ask the others whether there is any realistic hope that he will survive the expedition. The penguins rejoice that the humans will perish and they will soon be undisputed masters of their homeland again.

Part Two

Scott, Wilson and Bowers set up their tent and go inside. Oates hears the other three talking about him and decides to "disappear", but Bowers sees him and pushes him into the tent.

Part Three

A storm shakes the tent. Oates awakens and wants to leave the tent. Scott urges him to remain inside, but Oates ignores him and goes outside. Bowers commands him to return inside, but he is also ignored. The other three men step outside the tent but are unable to stop Oates as he disappears into the snow to his death. The chorus of penguins perform a Freudentanz (joyful dance) but then express admiration for Oates' act of self-sacrifice.

Scott, Bowers and Wilson show their respect for Oates and their admiration for his fulfillment of the highest duty.

The penguins remove their costumes. The orchestra plays a fortissimo passage to represent the storm. The final choral number, sung pianissimo, praises the dead and sings of immortality.

Music

Zillig, a pupil of Schoenberg, used a twelve-tone scale made up of major and minor triads. Although such dodecaphonic techniques were officially considered "degenerate" by Nazi authorities at the time, Zillig escaped censure, and was rewarded by being commissioned to write incidental music for the Reich Theatre Festival in Heidelberg.

Reception

The opera closed after four performances, having received mixed reviews. The reason for the premature closure is disputed. A number of sources claim that it was banned by the Nazi regime. Leane et al. (2014), while accepting this as a possibility, also suggest that the opera could have failed purely because of unpopularity, with the supposed Nazi ban being a self-serving story propagated by Zillig in order to make his work more acceptable in post-War Germany. The work was revived at the Kassel Opera House in 1961.

Notes

References

External links

 

 

German-language operas
1937 operas
Operas set in Antarctica
One-act operas
Operas based on plays
Operas
Cultural depictions of Robert Falcon Scott